Radica Games Limited was an American company that produces electronic games, founded in 1983. It began by producing electronic souvenir games for casinos. In the late 1990s, it became known for its Bass Fishin line of games. On October 3, 2006, Mattel, Inc. announced the completion of their acquisition of Radica. While Radica produced electronic handheld games based on casino or card games, it has branched out into toys, board games, and video game accessories.

Products
Product lines under Radica, past and present, include:
Stealth Assault - electronic motion sensor game where player tilts the device to fly a stealth plane shooting down jets
PlayTV - examples include PlayTV Football, Skateboarding, and Baseball
PlayTV Legends - formerly known as "Arcade Legends", the line includes plug-n-play systems featuring video games licensed from Sega and Taito, as well as Tetris
Skannerz
20Q -  electronic toy version 
Cube World - electronic toy featuring stick people as characters on black-and-white LCD screens, 2005 - 2008, each cube has contacts on top, bottom, and sides, 3 push buttons, and an internal motion sensor. Not to be confused with the game of the same name.
Series 1 Cube Types: 'Scoop' Orange, 'Slim' Purple, 'Whip' Yellow, 'Dodger' Red
Series 2 Cube Types: 'Mic' Pink, 'Hans' Light Blue, 'Handy' Dark Blue, 'Dusty' Light green (as pictured ->)
Series 3 Cube Types: 'Chief' Blue, 'Toner' Gray, 'Dash' Green, 'Sparky' Brown.
Series 4 Cube Types: 'Slugger' Light Red, 'Kicks' Green, 'Slam' Orange, 'Grinder' Tan
Series 5 Cube Types (with mods): 'Dart' Purple, 'Hip Hop' Black, 'Splash' Blue, 'Sci-Fi' White
Series Jumbo Cube Types: 'Block Bash' Yellow-Orange, 'Global Getaway' Blue
U.B. Funkeys - August 26, 2007 - 2010
Talking Buzz Lightyear
Loopz
Nascar Racer, 1998
I-Combat - a 3D game that is worn over the head
Big Screen Sudoku game
Blackjack 21
Poker-Blackjack Lite
Solitare
Color Screen Uno - backlit color Uno card game

See also 
Play TV
Majesco Entertainment
Jakks Pacific

References

External links 
 

Toy companies of the United States
Toy companies established in 1983
2006 mergers and acquisitions
Former Mattel subsidiaries
American companies established in 1983